Henderson Community College (HCC) is a community college in Henderson, Kentucky.  It is one of 16 two-year, open-admissions colleges of the Kentucky Community and Technical College System (KCTCS). It was established in 1960 under the leadership of the late Dr. Louis C. Alderman, Jr., the first Director of the Northwest Extension of the University of Kentucky.  The college became a charter member of the University of Kentucky's Community College System in 1964, changing its name to Henderson Community College. HCC became a member of KCTCS in 1998. HCC is accredited by the Southern Association of Colleges and Schools Commission on Colleges (SACSCOC) and most recently received reaffirmation for their accreditation through 2032.

Service area 

The primary service area of HCC includes:

 Henderson County
 Union County
 Webster County

HCC's enrollment is approximately 2,000 students. Approximately 60 percent are female.

Campus

The Hecht S. Lackey Administration Building (the original building) houses administrative and faculty offices as well as classrooms, conference rooms, an interactive TV room (for credit/non-credit instruction and videoconferencing), and administrative offices for the Murray State University satellite location. HCC is a regional campus location for Murray State University. Hecht Lackey was the mayor of Henderson and a supporter of the college when it was established.

The Robert H. English Arts and Sciences Building houses classrooms, computer laboratories, conference rooms, the Computer and Information Technology, Business Technology, and Human Services programs, the Career Connections Center (one-stop career center), cooperative education, and offices for faculty and staff.

The Academic Technical Building provides classrooms, conference rooms and laboratories for the clinical laboratory technician, medical assistant technology, nursing and dental hygiene programs, offices for faculty and staff, and a student activities center.

The Sullivan Technology Center provides classrooms for many of the HCC technical programs, houses the HCC Start Center, among other student amenities.

The Joseph M. Hartfield Library houses the Learning Skills Center, television and radio studios used in communications class instruction, career counseling and placement, faculty and staff offices and classrooms.

The Preston Arts Center is home to McCormick Hall that accommodates up to 1000 people, dressing rooms, prop storage, green room, catering and concessions areas, gallery space for visual arts, public meeting rooms for general community and college use. It was announced in 2016 that the building would be renamed The Preston Arts Center from The Henderson Fine Arts Center.

Programs and Certificates 
Henderson Community College currently offers over 16 programs that allow students to earn a degree or certificate.

2+2 Education programs

Agriculture

Associate in Arts

Associate in Science

Business Administration

Computer and Information Technologies

Early Childhood Education

HCC FAME

Health Science Technology

Industrial Maintenance Technology

Medical Assisting

Medical Laboratory Technician

Nursing Assistant/Nurse Aide

Nursing

Pharmacy Technician

Welding Technology

References

External links
Official website

Buildings and structures in Henderson County, Kentucky
Kentucky Community and Technical College System
Educational institutions established in 1960
Universities and colleges accredited by the Southern Association of Colleges and Schools
Education in Henderson County, Kentucky
Education in Union County, Kentucky
1960 establishments in Kentucky
Henderson, Kentucky